San Pietro ("St. Peter") is a Roman Catholic church in  Porto Venere, province of La Spezia, northern Italy, facing the Gulf of Poets.

The Church was built upon an ancient Pagan Temple.

History and description
It was officially consecrated in 1198. The part in white and black bands dating from the 13th century (probably made between 1256 and 1277), and was restored between 1931 and 1935. This part was derived from an older body, which consists of the early church, but left the bell tower is based on the chapel left of the presbytery.

The original church dates from the 5th century, in Syriac type, with rectangular plan and semicircular apse. It lost the title of parish in the late 14th century, in favor of the Church of San Lorenzo. It was officiated by the secular clergy until 1798.

Literary references
The poet Eugenio Montale dedicated a poem to the church.

Gallery

References

Churches in the province of La Spezia